Bathymunida balssi is a species of squat lobster in the family Munididae.

References

Squat lobsters
Crustaceans described in 1938